Dalaal is a 1993 Indian action drama film produced by Prakash Mehra and directed by Partho Ghosh, starring Mithun Chakraborty, Ayesha Jhulka in lead roles; Raj Babbar as the main antagonist. The film fetched good initial box-office collection primarily due to the songs composed by Bappi Lahiri. It was the eighth highest grossing Bollywood film of 1993.

Synopsis 
Dalaal is the story of the illiterate Bhola, who escorts young women to meet with their brothers. Bhola is enthusiastic and works diligently to earn the respect of everyone around him; but one day, during the course of his duties, he meets a beautiful woman named Roopali, who makes him understand the true nature of his job: that of a pimp. Whether Bhola will realize his mistake and redeem himself forms the climax.

Cast 
Mithun Chakraborty as Bhola 
Ayesha Jhulka as Roopali
Raj Babbar as Jagannath Tripathi
Tinu Anand as Chaku Singh
Shakti Kapoor as Jhunjhunwala
Rita Bhaduri as Mrs. Jhunjhunwala
Ravi Behl as Inder
Indrani Banerjee as Radha 
Tarun Ghosh as Bangali
Deb Mukherjee as Girdhari
Mangal Dhillon as Jagga
Satyendra Kapoor as Chatriprasad
Suresh Chatwal as Inspector Tambe
Vikas Anand as Bhola's Father

Soundtrack
The music of this movie was well appreciated with hit numbers like "Gutur Gutur" and was one of the final hit albums composed by Bappi Lahiri for a Mithun Chakraborty movie. It was also duel sut Hindi and Bengali.

Bengali Version

Reception
Dalaal received acclaim due to its music. Dalaal was among the super-hit films of 1993.

References

External links 
 

1993 films
1990s Hindi-language films
Mithun's Dream Factory films
Films shot in Ooty
Films scored by Bappi Lahiri
1990s action comedy-drama films
Indian action comedy-drama films
Indian action drama films